Clevedon Pier is the debut solo studio album by English musician Andy Davis. It received a UK release on the MMC label in 1989 and a US release by Relativity in 1991. The album was remastered and reissued by Angel Air Records in 2005 with two bonus tracks.

Background
Clevedon Pier was made after Peter Van Hooke, the founder of the UK label MMC, asked Davis if he would like to record a solo album. In a 2005 interview, Davis recalled, "It's always nice when somebody asks you to make a solo album. I was asked to do it by Peter. He [had] a record company so I kind of jumped at the chance." The album was recorded at Crescent Studios and Moles Studios in Bath.

Critical reception
Upon its release, Hi-Fi News & Record Review praised Clevedon Pier as a "soothing package from the multi-talented Davis" and "also a sonic delight". They added, "Try to imagine a stew of jazz, folk and pop and you're almost there." John Holt of the Nottingham Evening Post described it as "gentle new age-style stuff" where "traditional and unusual instruments blend on pieces that more often than not simply start, get louder then fade out". He picked "5 Saxes" as the album's best track, noting that the "multi-tracked brass belter" features Will Gregory.

The Clevedon Mercury considered the album to "demonstrate Andy's rich inventiveness and diversity of style" and added that "electronic orchestration blends smoothly with traditional hammer dulcimer, fiddle, mandolin and bass". In the US, Mike Gunderloy of Factsheet Five noted the mix of "electronics and traditional instruments" and felt the results "range from traditional Celtic to modern swing" with instrumentals that "soar and whirl in an exciting fashion".

Track listing

Personnel
 Andy Davis – guitar (1, 2, 4, 5, 7, 9, 10), keyboards (1, 2, 4–8, 10), vocals (2, 4, 7)
 Stuart Gordon – violin (1, 2), hammer dulcimer (1), mandolin (5)
 Peter Allerhand – guitar (1)
 Will Gregory – saxophone (2, 3)
 David Lord – keyboards (5, 8, 10)
 Jam Crisp – percussion (6)

Production
 Andy Davis – producer (1–10)
 David Lord – producer (1–10), engineer (1, 5–7, 8, 10)
 Stuart Gordon – producer (1–10)
 Mike Long – engineer (2–4, 6, 9, 10)
 John Sheaffe – programming

Other
 Andrew Douglas, The Douglas Brothers – photography
 Bill Smith Studio – design
 Neville Farmer – liner notes

References

1989 debut albums